Sataspes infernalis is a species of moth of the family Sphingidae. It is known from south-western and north-eastern India, Bangladesh, northern Myanmar and northern Thailand.

The thorax upperside is yellow, except for a black, ill-defined, transverse band. Sometimes, the centre of the thorax is more or less black.

References

Sataspes (moth)
Moths described in 1847